Pedro Mauricio Acevedo Meloni (born September 21, 1973, in Santiago, Chile) is a former Chilean footballer who played for clubs of Chile.

Teams
  Cobresal 1994–1999
  Colo-Colo 2000
  Unión Española 2001–2003
  Deportes Concepción 2004
  Santiago Morning 2005–2007

Titles
  Cobresal 1998 (Chilean Primera B Championship)
  Santiago Morning 2005 (Chilean Primera B Championship), 2007 (Relegation Playoffs (3 Teams))

References
 

1973 births
Living people
Footballers from Santiago
Chilean footballers
Cobresal footballers
Colo-Colo footballers
Unión Española footballers
Santiago Morning footballers
Deportes Concepción (Chile) footballers
Primera B de Chile players
Chilean Primera División players
Association football defenders